Zoya Alekseyevna Fyodorova (11 December 1981) was a Russian film star who had an affair with American Navy captain Jackson Tate in 1945 and bore a child, Victoria Fyodorova in January 1946. Having rejected the advances of NKVD police head Lavrentiy Beria, the affair was exposed resulting, initially, in a death sentence later reprieved to work camp imprisonment in Siberia; she was released after eight years. She was murdered in her Moscow apartment in 1981.

Career
Fyodorova was a well-known Russian film star starting in the 1930s, and some of the movies she appeared in were also seen in the United States, including Girl Friends in 1936. During her imprisonment she continued to perform in the Gulag theatres.

The year before Fyodorova was murdered, she appeared in Moscow Does Not Believe in Tears, which won an Academy Award for Best Foreign Language Film in 1980.

Reunion
University of Connecticut professor Irene Kirk learned of Victoria's story in 1959 and spent years trying to find Tate in the United States. Tate was unaware of having a daughter and of his former lover's arrest and imprisonment. When Kirk found Tate in 1973, she carried correspondence between the two back and forth to Moscow. In 1974, Tate began a campaign to convince the Soviet government to allow his daughter to travel to see him in the United States. Victoria was granted permission and arrived in the United States in March 1975 on a three-month travel visa, and spent several weeks in seclusion in Florida with Tate.

Fyodorova traveled to the United States to be with her daughter, Victoria, when her grandson, Christopher, was born in 1976. Victoria had married an American and stayed in the United States when she was reunited with her father in 1975. On that trip, Zoya Fyodorova was also reunited with her wartime lover, Jackson Tate.

In early 1981, Fyodorova was denied an exit visa by the Soviet government to leave the country and visit her daughter. The reason they gave was that her daughter had "behaved badly", referring to her book describing her parents' affair, The Admiral's Daughter, published in 1979.

Selected filmography
Counterplan (Встречный, 1932) as Chutochkin's wife (deleting scenes)
Girl Friends (Подруги, 1936) as Zoya
 The Great Citizen (Великий гражданин, 1938) as Nadya
 The Wedding (Свадьба, 1944) as Dasha, bride
 The Girl Without an Address (Девушка без адреса, 1957) as Komarinskaya
 A Groom from the Other World (Жених с того света, 1958) as chief medical officer
 Scarlet Sails (Алые паруса, 1961) as Governess
 A Tale of Lost Times (Сказка о потерянном времени, 1964) as aunt Natasha
 Give Me a Book of Complaints (Дайте жалобную книгу, 1965) as Yekaterina Ivanovna
 Operation Y and Shurik's Other Adventures (Операция «Ы» и другие приключения Шурика, 1965) as Lida's Neighbor
 Wedding in Malinovka (Свадьба в Малиновке, 1967) as Gorpina Dormidontovna
 Russian Field (Русское поле, 1971) as Matrona
 Moscow Does Not Believe in Tears (Москва слеза не верит, 1979) as Hostel's Security

Later life and death
Fyodorova lived in the Kutuzovsky Prospekt in Moscow. She died from a gunshot through her eye. No one was seen entering or exiting the apartment and the case remains unsolved. Her death was first reported in the American press as being an apparent heart attack.

See also
List of unsolved murders

References

External links

1907 births
1981 deaths
Actresses from Saint Petersburg
People from Sankt-Peterburgsky Uyezd
Russian film actresses
Russian murder victims
Soviet film actresses
Inmates of Lefortovo Prison
Inmates of Vladimir Central Prison
Stalin Prize winners
Unsolved murders in the Soviet Union
Deaths by firearm in Russia
Female murder victims
Burials at Vagankovo Cemetery
Soviet prisoners sentenced to death
Deaths by firearm in the Soviet Union
Prisoners sentenced to death by the Soviet Union